Peter Graeme Crawford (born 7 August 1947) is a Scottish former footballer.

References

External links
 

1947 births
Living people
Footballers from Falkirk
Scottish footballers
Association football goalkeepers
East Stirlingshire F.C. players
Sheffield United F.C. players
Mansfield Town F.C. players
York City F.C. players
Scunthorpe United F.C. players
Rochdale A.F.C. players
Scarborough F.C. players
English Football League players
National League (English football) players